Rabbi Goldie Milgram (born 1955) is an American rabbi, educator, and writer.  She is best known as the "rebbe-on-the-road," for her travels worldwide as a seeker and teacher of Torah, Jewish spiritual practices and she is a specialist in the fields of Jewish experiential and spiritual education. "Reb Goldie" founded (2000) and heads the 501C3 non-profit Reclaiming Judaism, serves as editor-in-chief for Reclaiming Judaism Press, and in 2014 she founded a three-year distance-learned training program for Jewish educators titled Jewish Spiritual Education (JSE): Maggid-Educator Training.

Her publications are numerous. They begin with Reclaiming Judaism as a Spiritual Practice: Holy Days and Shabbat (Jewish Lights Publishing) and Make Your Own Bar/Bat Mitzvah: A Personal Approach to Creating a Meaningful Rite of Passage. She founded and serves as Editor-in-Chief of Reclaiming Judaism Press and the Jewish spiritual education website and non-profit ReclaimingJudaism.org, with a first book release in 2009 titled Seeking and Soaring: Jewish Approaches to Spiritual Direction. Rabbi Milgram also has served as editor of the "Living Judaism" section of the Philadelphia Jewish Voice., a dean of the Academy for Jewish Religion, a founding faculty member of the Aleph Ordination Program, and a wide range of positions in Jewish life from Jewish Federation Executive, executive of Jewish agencies and schools, through leadership in summer camps, Jewish campus organizations, and teaching for programs such as Project Kesher, 92nd St Y, AMA, APA, Esalen, New York Open Center, and congregations, organizations, and universities worldwide.

Education
Rabbi Milgram received her undergraduate degree from the University of Pennsylvania in 1975, her MSW from the Wurzweiler School of Yeshiva University in 1979, her Masters in Hebrew Letters and Rabbinic Ordination from the Reconstructionist Rabbinical College in 1993, and her doctorate from New York Theological Seminary.  She also holds rabbinic, mashpi'ah, and shaliach ordination from Rabbi Zalman Schachter-Shalomi of the Jewish Renewal movement. She has been featured at the Jewish Futures Conference, honored by the American Cancer Society, and her programs, publications and resources have been honored by the Covenant Foundation and the National Jewish Book Awards.

Publications

Books

Selected articles

References

External links
Goldie Milgram Papers at the American Jewish Historical Society at the Center for Jewish History

1955 births
Living people
American Reconstructionist rabbis
American Jewish Renewal rabbis
University of Pennsylvania alumni
Reconstructionist women rabbis
Yeshiva University alumni
20th-century American rabbis
21st-century American rabbis